The Vanished People is a 1955 historical book by Ion Idriess. It tells stories of northern Australia and New Guinea, including the saga of Mary Watson in 1881.

References

External links
The Vanished People at AustLit

1955 non-fiction books
Books by Ion Idriess
Angus & Robertson books